Brown-throated treecreeper can refer to two species of Certhia:

Sikkim treecreeper, Certhia discolor
Hume's treecreeper, Certhia manipurensis

Birds by common name